Burlton is a hamlet in Shropshire, England.

External links

Villages in Shropshire